Steven Ritch (26 December 1921 – 20 July 1995) was an American actor, perhaps best known for his lead role in the 1956 film The Werewolf.

Early life
Steven Ritch was born on December 26, 1921, in Providence, Rhode Island.

Career
Ritch's career ran from 1950 to 1962, and he had 45 acting credits in films and television.

He also worked as a screenwriter in feature films and television. He wrote the screenplay for the 1957 film Plunder Road, as well as acting in the movie, delivering a "stand-out performance as a nervous wheelman", according to CinemaScope.

Later life
Ritch died on July 20, 1995, in Rogue River, Oregon, aged 73.

Selected filmography
Destination Murder (1950) as Waiter
Siren of Bagdad (1953) as A Soldier
Valley of the Head Hunters (1953) as Lt. Barry
Conquest of Cochise (1953) as Tukiwah
The Great Adventures of Captain Kidd (1953) as Barrett
The Battle of Rogue River (1954) as Indian
Massacre Canyon (1954) as Black Eagle
Riding with Buffalo Bill (1954) as Elko
Seminole Uprising (1955) as Black Cat
Apache Ambush (1955) as Townsman
The Crooked Web (1955) as Ramon Torres
The Werewolf (1956) as Duncan Marsh
Bailout at 43,000 (1957) as Major Irv Goldman
Plunder Road (1957) as Frankie Chardo
Murder by Contract (1958) as Detective
City of Fear (1959) as Dr. John Wallace
Studs Lonigan (1960) as Gangster

References

1921 births
1995 deaths
American male film actors
People from Providence, Rhode Island
People from Rogue River, Oregon
20th-century American screenwriters